Daniel Stacey Martin (August 31, 1880 – November 5, 1949) was an American football coach. He served as the head football coach at the University of Mississippi (Ole Miss) in 1902 and at The Agricultural and Mechanical College of the State of Mississippi—now known as Mississippi State University—from the 1903 to 1906. During his one-season tenure at Mississippi, Martin compiled an overall record of four wins and three losses (4–3). During his four-season tenure at Mississippi A&M, Martin compiled an overall record of ten wins, eleven losses and three ties (10–11–3).

Stacy married Emily May MacEvoy. He later worked in the electrical and mechanical engineering industry. He was also president of the McClary-Jemison Machinery Company in Birmingham, Alabama at one point.  He died in November 1949 of a heart attack. He had been in declining health since a mining accident in Mexico in 1935, which left him semi-disabled.

Head coaching record

References

External links
 

1880 births
1949 deaths
19th-century players of American football
American football guards
Auburn Tigers football players
Mississippi State Bulldogs athletic directors
Mississippi State Bulldogs football coaches
Ole Miss Rebels football coaches
People from Barbour County, Alabama
Coaches of American football from Alabama
Players of American football from Alabama